Austin Patrick "Ocker" Robertson (21 November 1907 – 6 May 1988) was an Australian rules footballer who played for the South Melbourne Football Club in the Victorian Football League (VFL) and West Perth Football Club in the Western Australian National Football League (WANFL).

Robertson debuted with South Melbourne at the age of 18 and played for the club between 1927 and 1937. He was well regarded as a key position player at both ends of the ground. He was one of the few players still adept at place kicking during the 1930s, noted for the length and accuracy of his kicks; he made several attempts over his career to break Dave McNamara's record for longest kick, often topping 70 yards but never breaking McNamara's mark of 86yds.

While at South Melbourne, he was also a world champion professional sprinter, winning the world title in 1930. He missed out on South Melbourne's 1933 premiership win because he was in America organising a head-to-head race with Eddie Tolan at the Chicago World's Fair. However, when he arrived in the United States, Tolan was not in training and was unable to race.

During the 1937 season, Robertson was transferred to Perth by his employer, General Motors-Holden. He was cleared to West Perth and played there for the rest of 1937. In 1938, he switched to Perth, and served as its playing coach for the next two years. General Motors returned Robertson to Victoria in 1940 and, despite expectations that he would return to South Melbourne, he signed with Victorian Football Association club Port Melbourne for a reported £6 per week, and crossed without a clearance from South Melbourne. He played for Port Melbourne under the VFA's throw-pass rules until 1941.

He was the youngest son of Mr and Mrs John Robertson, was educated at Xavier College Kew and married Dorothy McDonald in Elwood on 22 June 1940. His brother, Harold Robertson, and son, Austin Robertson Jr. were also champion footballers.

Robertson later served in the Australian Army during World War II.

See also
 1927 Melbourne Carnival

References

External links

1907 births
1988 deaths
People educated at Xavier College
Australian male sprinters
Athletes from Melbourne
Australian rules footballers from Melbourne
Australian Rules footballers: place kick exponents
Sydney Swans players
Port Melbourne Football Club players
West Perth Football Club players
Perth Football Club players
Perth Football Club coaches
People from Albert Park, Victoria
Australian Army personnel of World War II
Military personnel from Melbourne
Australian twins
Twin sportspeople
Holden people